The 1992–93 Maine Black Bears Men's ice hockey season was the 16th season of play for the program, the 14th season competing at the Division I level, and the 9th season in the Hockey East conference. The Black Bears represented the University of Maine and played their home games at Alfond Arena, and were coached by Shawn Walsh, in his 9th season as their head coach. Led by freshman phenom and future Hockey Hall of Famer Paul Kariya, the Black Bears compiled an unprecedented record of 42-1-2, dominating the competition on the way to winning the national championship, the first in school history.

Personnel

Head Coach: Shawn Walsh, 9th season

Roster

Standings

Schedule and Results

|-
!colspan=12 style=";" | Regular Season

|-
!colspan=12 style=";" | 

|-
!colspan=12 style=";" |

Scoring statistics

Goaltending statistics

1993 national championship

(E1) Maine vs. (W1) Lake Superior State

Players drafted into the NHL

1993 NHL Entry Draft

† incoming freshman

1993 NHL Supplemental Draft

References

Maine Black Bears men's ice hockey seasons
Maine
Maine
Maine
Maine
Maine
Maine